Red Bluff (colloquially known as Mississippi's Little Grand Canyon) is a natural geologic feature, located in Marion County, Mississippi, located about 1.5 miles northwest of the community of Morgantown.

Geologic description
Red Bluff is a geological formation created by the natural erosion of the west bank of the Pearl River. The bluff is an exposure red clay, soil, sand, and other colorful sediments and rises to an elevation of approximately 371 feet above sea level. The bluff slopes sharply (200 feet) into the Pearl River floodplain. The natural erosion process continues and has forced the movement of nearby Mississippi Highway 587 at least two times.

Tourism
The view from the bluff encompasses a significant portion of the Pearl River Basin in Marion County, as well as the eastern portion of the nearby city of Columbia, Mississippi. The land where the bluff is located is privately owned, so hiking is prohibited, but the bluff can be viewed from roadside parking areas along Mississippi Highway 587.

See also
Providence Canyon State Park

References

Landmarks in Mississippi
Landforms of Marion County, Mississippi
Tourist attractions in Marion County, Mississippi
Landforms of Mississippi
Cliffs of the United States